Salthouse is a village in Norfolk, England.

Salthouse may also refer to:

Salthouse, Barrow-in-Furness, England
Salthouse Dock, Liverpool, England
Salthouse (surname), a surname